(Alfred) Clifford Jarvis (6 February 1908; 21 November 1981) was  an Anglican priest.

Jarvis was educated at Sudbury Grammar School, Fitzwilliam House Cambridge and Lichfield Theological College. After a curacy in Brightlingsea he held incumbencies at Horningsea, Coddenham, Elsfield and Algarkirk. He was Archdeacon of Lincoln 1958 to 1960 and then of Lindsey to 1971.

Notes

1908 births
1981 deaths
Archdeacons of Lincoln
Archdeacons of Lindsey
20th-century English Anglican priests
People educated at Sudbury Grammar School
Alumni of Fitzwilliam College, Cambridge
Alumni of Lichfield Theological College